Mary Underwood is a former international lawn bowls competitor for Australia.

Bowls career
In 1973 she won three medals at the 1973 World Outdoor Bowls Championship in Wellington. A bronze medal in the singles, a silver medal in the triples with Joan Vaughan and Olive Rowe and another silver medal in the team event (Taylor Trophy).

Underwood made her state debut in 1967 for Western Australia and bowled for the Civic Centre Bowls Club.

References

Date of birth missing
Possibly living people
Year of birth missing
Australian female bowls players
20th-century Australian women